L'Anse-à-l'Orme Nature Park is a large nature park in the Pierrefonds-Roxboro borough of Montreal, Quebec, Canada.

Senneville Road, opens onto a vast expanse of water, a widening of the Lake of Two Mountains, called l'Anse à l'Orme.

History
Some believed that the name would indicate the presence of elms here. Others say that the place name commemorates Julien Hubert dit Delorme to whom the land adjacent to the cove had been granted in 1698. The name "Rivière Anse à l'Orme" can be found on maps starting in 1744, on which the name appears to refer to as the cove as well.

On 17 September 2008 the city of Montreal announced a  expansion of the park. The enlarged area is composed mostly of marshland west of Pierrefonds-Roxboro.

The park's area was further enlarged when, in 2011, an additional  of land belonging to Investissement Québec in the Rivière à l'Orme ecoterritory in the neighbouring municipality of Sainte-Anne-de-Bellevue was annexed to it. This expansion ensured the conservation of the pockets of forests and wetlands, in addition to adding to the numerous trails used for  walking and biking and recreational areas.

Plans
As of 2020, the City of Montreal has a plan to include the park into the future Grand Parc de L’Ouest.

References

External links
  (Montreal's Nature Parks)

Parks in Montreal
Pierrefonds-Roxboro
Marshes of Canada